Thomas Schalekamp (born 5 June 2000) is a Dutch footballer who plays as a forward for Derde Divisie club GVV Unitas.

Club career
He made his Eerste Divisie debut for FC Dordrecht on 5 October 2018 in a game against Cambuur, as an injury-time substitute for Jeremy Cijntje.

On 18 February 2022, Schalekamp signed for Tweede Divisie club SV TEC. He made his debut on 19 February 2022, coming on as a substitute for Jason Wall in a 1-1 draw with GVVV.

On 1 July 2022, Schalekamp signed for GVV Unitas.

References

External links
 
 Career stats & Profile - Voetbal International

2000 births
Living people
Footballers from Dordrecht
Association football forwards
Dutch footballers
SC Emma players
FC Dordrecht players
SV TEC players
Eerste Divisie players